Mark B. Rober (born ) is an American YouTuber, engineer, inventor, and educator. He is known for his YouTube videos on popular science and do-it-yourself gadgets. Before YouTube, Rober was an engineer with NASA for nine years, where he spent seven years working on the Curiosity rover at NASA's Jet Propulsion Laboratory. He later worked for four years at Apple Inc. as a product designer in their Special Projects Group, where he authored patents involving virtual reality in self-driving cars.

Early life
Rober was raised in Orange County, California. He became interested in engineering at a young age, making a pair of goggles that helped avoid tears while cutting onions. Rober earned a mechanical engineering degree from Brigham Young University as well as a master's degree from the University of Southern California.

Career

Early career (NASA)
Rober joined NASA’s Jet Propulsion Laboratory (JPL) in 2004. He worked there for nine years, seven of which were spent working on the Curiosity rover, which is now on Mars. He designed and delivered hardware on several JPL missions, including AMT, GRAIL, SMAP, and Mars Science Laboratory. While at NASA, Rober was one of the primary architects for "JPL Wired", which was a comprehensive knowledge capture wiki. He published a case study about applying wiki technology in a high-tech organization to develop an "Intrapedia" for the capture of corporate knowledge.

YouTube channel, science communication 

During his time at NASA, Rober began making viral videos. His videos cover a wide variety of topics, sparking ideas for April Fools' Day pranks and teaching about tricks like beating an escape room and filming primates in zoos non-invasively. He also advocates for science in many of his videos.

In October 2011, Rober recorded his first YouTube video. It shows a Halloween costume that used two iPads to create the illusion of seeing through his body. His video of the "gaping hole in torso" costume went viral, receiving 1.5 million views in just one day. The following year, Rober launched Digital Dudz, an online Halloween costume company that specializes in Halloween costumes based on the same concept as the video (to which Rober holds the patent). The company took in $250,000 in revenue in its first three weeks of operations, and by 2013 his app-integrated costumes were sold in retail stores such as Party City. The costumes were widely featured on news channels such as CBS News, CNN, The Tonight Show with Jay Leno, Fox, Yahoo! News, Discovery Channel, The Today Show and GMA. He sold the company to UK-based costume company Morphsuits in 2013.

In December 2018, Rober posted a video showing how he tricked parcel thieves with an engineered contraption that sprayed glitter on the thieves, emitted a foul odor, and captured video of the thieves. The video went viral, receiving 25 million views in one day. Rober later removed two of the five incidents caught on tape after discovering that two of the thieves were actually friends of a person he hired to help catch the package thieves. Rober posted a follow-up in December 2019, teaming up with Macaulay Culkin and featuring an improved design. Rober would post another follow up a year later, featuring a third edition of the bomb. During the process of building the third bomb, Rober collaborated with Jim Browning, ScammerPayback, and various state and federal authorities to use the glitter bomb bait package as a tactic to track and arrest money mules and their supervisors, who were working with scamming call centers in India to rob elderly people of thousands of dollars. This was in conjunction with a multi-Youtuber movement to get back at and shut down scam callers, while raising awareness to prevent other people from being scammed in the future. The videos resulted in the shutdown of these call centers and the arrest of 15 senior officials involved in the scams.

In 2021, Rober released the video Backyard Squirrel Maze, showcasing a backyard obstacle course he built to deter squirrels from stealing food from the bird feeders in his backyard. He released a follow-up video of an updated obstacle course a year later. The original video had 96.2 million views by August 2022, with the second video gaining 61.4 million view by that same time.

Rober has contributed articles to Men's Health, and gave a TEDx presentation in 2015 How to Come Up with Good Ideas and another one entitled The Super Mario Effect – Tricking Your Brain into Learning More. He has also made numerous appearances on Jimmy Kimmel Live!, including guest hosting the show in July 2022.

In 2018, it was reported that Rober had been secretly working on virtual reality projects for Apple Inc., including the company's on-board entertainment for self-driving cars, for which Rober wrote two virtual reality-related patents. Rober worked as a product designer in Apple's Special Projects Group from 2015 to early 2020. In 2020, Rober will star in a Discovery Channel hidden-camera show Revengineers alongside Jimmy Kimmel.

In October 2019, the YouTube community released a project labeled #TeamTrees, organized by MrBeast and Rober following a tweet that suggested that MrBeast should plant 20 million trees. MrBeast and Rober worked with YouTubers across the globe in an effort to make this come true. The goal of this project was to raise $20,000,000 for the Arbor Day Foundation by 2020, and in exchange, the Arbor Day Foundation would plant one tree for each dollar raised. Then, in 2021, he founded #TeamSeas along with MrBeast, which raised $33 million for cleaning up beaches and seas, along with removing 1 pound for each dollar donated, using help from The Ocean Cleanup.

Personal life
Rober moved to Sunnyvale, California in 2015. Rober is an advocate for autism awareness, as his son lives with it. In April 2021, Mark Rober and Jimmy Kimmel hosted a live stream, raising $3 million in support of NEXT for AUTISM.

Awards and nominations 
In 2021, as part of the Institution’s celebrations, Mark Rober was awarded a one-off prize as STEM Personality of the Year, following nominations from across the globe. Later that year, Rober was awarded an Honorary Fellowship by the Institution of Engineering and Technology in recognition of his outstanding contribution to the engineering profession. This honor was granted during the Institution’s 150th anniversary year.

Notes

References

External links
 

1980s births
Living people
21st-century American inventors
American mechanical engineers
American YouTubers
Apple Inc. employees
Brigham Young University alumni
Charity fundraisers (people)
DIY YouTubers
NASA people
Online edutainment
People from Orange County, California
Science communicators
University of Southern California alumni
Education-related YouTube channels
Autism activists